Beeston and Stapleford was an urban district in Nottinghamshire, England, from 1935 to 1974.

It was created by a County Review Order.  Beeston had previously been part of Beeston Urban District itself, to which was added the entirety of the Stapleford Rural District, consisting of the parishes of Bramcote, Chilwell, Stapleford and Toton.  The urban district bordered the county borough of Nottingham in the north west, two disconnected parts of the Basford Rural District to the north and south, and to the west the South East Derbyshire Rural District and Long Eaton in Derbyshire.

The council built itself Beeston Town Hall on Foster Avenue in Beeston at a cost of £18,500 designed by the architectural firm of Evans, Clark and Woollatt which opened on 24 March 1938.

Since 1974 it has formed part of the Broxtowe borough.

Chairmen of the council

W. Ireland 1935 - 1936
Alfred Redwood 1936 - 1937
W.V. Potts 1937 - 1938
J. Taylor 1938 - 1939
Fitzherbert Wright 1939 - 1940
J.T. Welch 1940 - 1941
Joseph Heard 1942 - 1943
Douglas Leonard Booth 1943 - 1944
W. Ireland 1944 - 1945
Mrs. E Littlewood 1945 - 1946
Frederick William Litchfield 1946 - 1947
H.R. Winstanley 1947 - 1948
W. Ireland 1948 - 1949
T.L.V. White 1949 - 1950
G.H. Peel 1950 - 1951
R. Banks 1952 - 1953
F. Stowell 1953 - 1954
Alex T. Oldham 1955 - 1956
F. Scothern 1956 - 1957
Victor H. Oade 1957 - 1958
G.H. Peel 1958 - 1959
J. William (Bill) Plowman 1959 - 1960
Mrs. F. Wilson 1960 - 1961
F.T. Brough 1961 - 1962
C.W. Anderson 1962 - 1963
Mrs. F.E. Bradley 1963 - 1964
J.R. Oldershaw 1964 - 1965
N. Challenger 1965 - 1966
N.B. Fortune 1966 - 1967
Alex T. Oldham 1967 - 1968
F. Scothern 1968 - 1969
E. Ray Hudson 1969 - 1970
John Sutton 1970 - 1971
Gordon Mee 1971 - 1972
Harold Clifford 1972 - 1973
Grenville Stanley 1973 - 1974

References

Districts of England abolished by the Local Government Act 1972
History of Nottinghamshire
Urban districts of Nottinghamshire
Borough of Broxtowe
1935 establishments in England